The Union of South Africa competed at the 1912 Summer Olympics in Stockholm, Sweden. 21 competitors, all men, took part in 21 events in 6 sports.

Medalists

Gold
 Ken McArthur — Athletics, Men's Marathon
 Rudolph Lewis — Cycling, Men's Individual Time Trial
 Harold Kitson and Charles Winslow — Tennis, Men's doubles outdoor
 Charles Winslow — Tennis, Men's singles outdoor

Silver
 Christian Gitsham — Athletics, Men's Marathon
 Harold Kitson — Tennis Men's singles outdoor

Aquatics

Swimming

A single swimmer competed for South Africa at the 1912 Games. It was the nation's debut in swimming. Godfrey competed in one event, placing fifth in his quarterfinal of the 400 metre freestyle and not advancing to the semifinals.

Ranks given for each swimmer are within the heat.

 Men

Athletics

Seven athletes represented South Africa. It was the nation's third appearance in both the sport and the Olympics. McArthur and Gitsham finished first and second, respectively, in the marathon to give South Africa its only athletics medals in 1912 as well as an Olympic record in the event with McArthur's mark. Richardson's Olympic record in the 10000 metres, set in the semifinals, was broken in the final; Richardson did not finish that race.

Ranks given are within that athlete's heat for running events.

Cycling

A single cyclist represented South Africa. It was the second appearance of the nation in cycling. Rudolph Lewis won the gold medal, South Africa's first cycling medal.

Road cycling

Fencing

A single fencer represented South Africa. It was the second appearance of the nation in fencing. Walter Gate, who had also been South Africa's only fencer in 1908, competed in all three weapons and was defeated in the first round of each competition.

Shooting 

Eight shooters represented South Africa. It was the nation's first appearance in shooting. The South African team took fourth place in the team rifle competition; this was the closest the nation got to winning a medal in shooting. The best individual performance was Harvey's tenth place finish in the military rifle.

Tennis 

Three tennis players represented South Africa at the 1912 Games. It was the nation's second appearance in tennis. 

Kitson and Winslow dominated the men's outdoor competitions. They met in the final of the singles tournament, with Winslow taking the championship and Kitson winning silver. The two also paired up for the doubles tournament, defeating all their opponents to add a third medal. Tapscott, competing in the singles only, advanced to the round of 16 before losing to an eventual semifinalist.

 Men

References

External links
Official Olympic Reports
International Olympic Committee results database

Nations at the 1912 Summer Olympics
1912 
Olympics